Heřmánek (feminine Heřmánková) is a Czech surname. Notable people with the surname include:

 Jan Heřmánek (1907–1978), Czech boxer
 Jodi Hermanek, American softball coach
 Karel Heřmánek (born 1947), Czech actor

Czech-language surnames